Tapani Olavi Tölli (born 13 June 1951 in Sievi, Finland) is a Finnish Member of Parliament from Tyrnävä representing the Centre Party. He has previously been the Tyrnävä municipal manager. Tölli has been the Minister for Public Administration and Local Government in the government led by Prime Minister Mari Kiviniemi, having been chosen by Kiviniemi to fill the vacancy left by herself. Tölli has been a Member of Parliament since the 2003 parliamentary elections. Tölli has a master's degree in political science. He has been married since 1981 and has six children. His military rank is major.

External links
 Home page
 Tapani Tölli on the parliament´s web page

1951 births
Living people
People from Sievi
Finnish Lutherans
Centre Party (Finland) politicians
Government ministers of Finland
Members of the Parliament of Finland (2003–07)
Members of the Parliament of Finland (2007–11)
Members of the Parliament of Finland (2011–15)
Members of the Parliament of Finland (2015–19)